Brian Dale Arnfelt (born October 11, 1989) is an American lawyer and former professional football player who played for Northwestern University and the Pittsburgh Steelers of the National Football League (NFL).

Early life and education
Arnfelt attended Stillwater Area High School in Stillwater, Minnesota, where he was a member of the National Honor Society and captain of the varsity football and track and field teams.

Arnfelt attended Northwestern University in Evanston, Illinois, where he was a member of the varsity football team and played defensive line for the Northwestern Wildcats. His senior year, Arnfelt was an Academic All-American selection and team captain. In 2012-2013, Arnfelt led the Wildcats to their first bowl victory since 1948 and a 10-3 record, finishing 17th in the AP Poll and 16th in the Coaches Poll.

Football career
Arnfelt impressed scouts at Northwestern's pro day on March 5, 2013. He ran a 4.81 second 40-yard dash and bench pressed 225 lbs for 38 reps.

Following the 2013 NFL Draft on April 27, 2013, Arnfelt signed a free agent contract with the Pittsburgh Steelers. After spending time on the Steelers practice squad in 2013, Arnfelt was promoted to the active roster on December 14, 2013.

References

1989 births
Living people
American football defensive ends
American football defensive tackles
Northwestern Wildcats football players
Pittsburgh Steelers players
People from Stillwater, Minnesota
Players of American football from Minnesota
University of Michigan Law School alumni
People from Lake Elmo, Minnesota